The Embassy of the State of Palestine in Uzbekistan is the diplomatic mission of the Palestine in Uzbekistan. It is located in Tashkent.

See also

List of diplomatic missions in Uzbekistan.
List of diplomatic missions of Palestine.

References

Diplomatic missions of the State of Palestine
Diplomatic missions in Uzbekistan
State of Palestine–Uzbekistan relations